Herbert McDowell served in the California State Assembly for the 51st district from 1921 to 1927. and during World War I he served in the United States Army.

References

United States Army personnel of World War I
Year of birth missing
Republican Party members of the California State Assembly